Sylvicola fuscatus is a species of wood gnats, insects in the family Anisopodidae.

References

Anisopodidae
Articles created by Qbugbot
Insects described in 1775
Taxa named by Johan Christian Fabricius